The Henry L. and Sarah Dahle House is located in Mount Horeb, Wisconsin.

History
Henry L. Dahle was a member of a prominent family. His brother, Herman Dahle, would become a member of the United States House of Representatives. Dahle died before the house was completed, but his widow, Sarah, would go on to reside in it and the house remained in the family until the 1990s. In 2003, it was added to the State and the National Register of Historic Places.

The Herman B. and Anne Marie Dahle House and the Onon B. and Betsy Dahle House, which also belonged to members of the Dahle family, are also listed on the National Register of Historic Places.

References

Houses on the National Register of Historic Places in Wisconsin
National Register of Historic Places in Dane County, Wisconsin
Houses in Dane County, Wisconsin
Prairie School architecture in Wisconsin
Brick buildings and structures
Houses completed in 1916